Antcin B is a steroid isolated from the mushroom Antrodia camphorata.

References

Steroids
Carboxylic acids